Calliandra haematocephala is a species of flowering plants of the genus Calliandra in the family Fabaceae.

Description
Rambling shrub or small tree with branched pinnate, silky leaves and powder-puff-like balls of conspicuous dark crimson stamens. Calliandra haematocephala is a fast growing shrub that can grow tall but also spreads wide. If desired it can be kept smaller by trimming. Interesting enough the leaves close at night. The red powder puff flower are attractive to butterflies and hummingbirds but only appear from November -April. The buds before the flowers open look like raspberries. This large shrub can be grown indoor if trimmed and grown in a pot but it will be best if you can grow it outside in a warm climate.

Uses

Gallery

References

haematocephala